The Minister of Democratic Institutions was a Minister of the Crown in the Canadian Cabinet, associated with the Privy Council Office. The position was first created in 2003 as "Minister responsible for Democratic Reform". It was also titled "Minister responsible for Democratic Renewal" and "Minister of State (Democratic Reform)" during various governments. The position was abolished on November 20, 2019.

History

Under Martin (2003–2006)
The position was created by Prime Minister Paul Martin when he succeeded Jean Chrétien in December 2003 under the title "Minister responsible for Democratic Reform" to address the "democratic deficit", an issue Martin campaigned on when he ran for leader of the Liberal Party of Canada.

The portfolio was initially held by the Government House Leader, Jacques Saada, in Martin's first cabinet. After the 2004 election, the portfolio was given to Mauril Bélanger, who was the deputy government house leader.

When Belinda Stronach crossed the floor from the Conservative Party to Liberals on May 17, 2005, she assumed responsibilities for the portfolio along with the post of Minister of Human Resources and Skills Development. At this point the title was changed from "Democratic Reform" to "Democratic Renewal".

Under Harper (2006–2015) 
Under the premiership of Stephen Harper, the post was first held by his first two House Leaders (Rob Nicholson and Peter Van Loan) as "Leader of the House of Commons and Minister for Democratic Reform". In 2008, the role was taken up by Steven Fletcher as "Minister of State (Democratic Reform)" and the same title was subsequently held by Tim Uppal and Pierre Poilievre.

Under Trudeau (2015–2019) 
In the ministry of Justin Trudeau, who was elected on campaign promises of electoral reform, the portfolio was assigned to Maryam Monsef in November 2015, under the new title "Minister of Democratic Institutions".

In the mandate letter provided to Monsef by Trudeau, she has been instructed to table an action plan outlining proposals to reform the operations of the House of Commons of Canada in order to increase the role of individual Members of Parliament in the House and its committees. Proposals include allowing more free votes, giving committees more authority, increase research budgets, allowing chairs of house committees to be elected rather than appointed by the prime minister, giving MPs a role in choosing which committees they sit on rather than having them assigned by the prime minister or government house leader. She oversaw the formation of the all-party Special Committee on Electoral Reform and appeared as its first witness.

Following criticism of her handling of the portfolio, Monsef was named Minister of Status of Women on February 1, 2017 and Karina Gould was appointed in her place. On February 1, 2017, Gould announced that her mandate would no longer include exploring potential changes to the Canadian electoral system.

On November 20, 2019, as part of Trudeau's Cabinet shuffle following the 2019 Canadian federal election, the Democratic Institutions portfolio was abolished. Joan Bryden of the Canadian Press reported that the position's responsibilities would be transferred to Dominic LeBlanc in his role as President of the Queen's Privy Council for Canada.

List
Key:

References

External links
Government of Canada - Democratic Reform

Democratic Institutions
Electoral reform in Canada